Lerdsila Muaythai Iyarin (born October 22, 1981) is a Thai Muay Thai kickboxer. Lerdsila is a multiple-time Muay Thai world champion (WMC, WBC, WLF, WPMF, WCK) and three-time Rajadamnern Stadium champion across three weight classes. He is also a world kickboxing champion.

Biography
He first began training in Muay Thai at the age of 7 under his father’s tutelage and had his first bout that same year. Lerdsila then moved to Bangkok when he was 12 years old to pursue a career in professional Muay Thai, training at Jocky Gym which created many legendary fighters such as Saenchai, Somrak Khamsing, Silapathai, and Rolek Kaennorasing. Lerdsila has competed countless times at the famed Lumpinee and Rajadamnern Stadiums, even claiming the prestigious Rajadamnern Muay Thai World Title in three different weight classes.  In 2015, Lerdsila moved to train at Phuket Top Team.

Outside of fighting, Lerdsila enjoys association football, music, and singing karaoke.

Fighting style
Lerdsila developed his style through a long period of training in Jocky Gym, where fighters were trained to be fast, elusive and technical oriented. Lerdsila explained that he likes to mix Muay Thai with techniques he saw in other martial arts such as Taekwondo, Karate and Boxing. Lerdsila doesn't take fights too seriously: he doesn't care about winning or losing, but to have fun during fights by taunting, keep his opponents guessing, making them angry to break their concentration during fights. People call Lerdsila "The Eel on a skateboard" because of how evasive he is; Lerdsila is extremely good at incorporating the Teep and head movements into his defense, especially countering flashy, explosive kicks of his opponents.

But, no matter the opponent or where ever he fought, Lerdsila says he went out to fight and enjoy it. After 200 fights, he said the most important thing in the sport is to enjoy what you're doing. Most importantly, Lerdsila says respecting your opponents is the most important thing when Thai boxing, which led to his style of fighting being fun and playful.

Muay Thai career
He fought Wei Ninghui during Kunlun Fight 23. Lerdsila won a unanimous decision.

Lerdsila suffered decision loss to Deng Zeqi during the 2015 Wu Lin Feng & WCK Muaythai: China vs USA event.

Lerdsila fought Tang Yao in January 2016. He won a unanimous decision.

He fought Zheng Kai in June 2017, winning the fight by a unanimous decision.

Lerdsila fought Kang En during the 2017 Hero Legend event. The fight went into an extra fourth round, where Lerdsila won a decision.

ONE Championship
Lerdsila recently signed with ONE Championship.

On June 23, 2018, he made his debut at ONE Championship: Pinnacle of Power, where he defeated Sok Thy by split decision.

On November 17, 2018, he faced Sok Thy a second time at ONE Championship: Warrior's Dream, where Lerdsila won by unanimous decision.

On April 12, 2019, Lerdsila defeated Kohei "Momotaro" Kodera by unanimous decision at ONE Championship: Roots of Honor.

On August 16, 2019, he faced Michael Savvas at ONE Championship: Dreams of Gold. Savvas lost by TKO when he was thrown and landed at an awkward angle on his elbow.

In the last ONE event of 2019, Lerdsila faced Elias Mahmoudi at ONE Championship: Mark Of Greatness on December 9, 2019. He would lose by unanimous decision, marking his first loss in ONE Championship.

Post career
Lerdsila has said he never intends to fully leave the sport of Muay Thai said after his pro fighting career is finished, he intends to open his own gym to train the next generation of fighters.

Titles and accomplishments
Muay Thai
Suk Muay Femur
2021 Suk Muay Femur Super Lightweight Champion (140 lbs / 63.5 kg)
Hero Legends
2017 Hero Legends Bantamweight World Champion
Lion Fight 
2017 Lion Fight Lightweight World Champion
Wu Lin Feng (WLF) 
2013 WLF Muaythai Lightweight World Champion
WCK Muaythai 
2011 WCK Muaythai Lightweight World Champion
World Muaythai Council (WMC) 
WMC Lightweight World Champion (three times)
World Professional Muaythai Federation (WPMF)
WPMF Lightweight World Champion
Rajadamnern Stadium 
Rajadamnern Stadium Super Bantamweight Champion (122 lbs / 56.341 kg)
Rajadamnern Stadium Bantamweight Champion (118 lbs / 55 kg)
Rajadamnern Stadium Super Flyweight Champion (115 lbs / 52 kg)

World Games
 2013 World Games -63.5 kg

Fight record

|-  style="background:#fbb;"
| 2021-11-27 || Loss|| align=left| Huang Shuailu || Wu Lin Feng 2021: World Contender League 7th Stage || Zhengzhou, China ||Ext.R Decision || 4 ||3:00
|-  style="background:#cfc;"
| 2021-07-11|| Win||align=left| Tyson Harrison|| Suk Muay Femur || Pattaya, Thailand || Decision || 5 || 3:00
|-
! style=background:white colspan=9 |
|-  style="background:#fbb;"
| 2019-12-09|| Loss||align=left| Elias Mahmoudi ||  |ONE Championship: Mark Of Greatness || Kuala Lumpur, Malaysia ||  Decision (Unanimous) || 3 || 3:00
|-  style="background:#cfc;"
| 2019-08-16|| Win||align=left| Savvas Michael|| |ONE Championship: Dreams of Gold || Bangkok, Thailand || TKO (Arm Injury/Thrown) || 2 || 0:40
|-  style="background:#cfc;"
| 2019-04-12|| Win||align=left| Momotaro|| |ONE Championship: Roots of Honor || Manila, Philippines || Decision (Unanimous) || 3 || 3:00
|-  style="background:#cfc;"
| 2018-11-17|| Win||align=left| Sok Thy|| |ONE Championship: Warrior's Dream || Jakarta, Indonesia || Decision (Unanimous) || 3 || 3:00
|-  style="background:#cfc;"
| 2018-06-23 || Win||align=left| Sok Thy|| |ONE Championship: Pinnacle of Power || Beijing, China || Decision (Split) || 3 || 3:00
|-  style="background:#cfc;"
| 2018-02-03 || Win||align=left| Alexi Serepisos||Lion Fight 40|| United States || Decision (Unanimous) || 5 || 3:00
|-  bgcolor="#CCFFCC"
| 2017-12-31 || Win || align=left| Kang En || Hero Legend 2017 || China || Ext.R Decision || 4 || 3:00 
|-
! style=background:white colspan=9 |
|-  bgcolor="#CCFFCC"
| 2017-09-09 || Win || align=left| Chen Wanhai || Hero Legend 2017 || Tai'an, China || TKO || 2 || 
|-  style="background:#cfc;"
| 2017-06-25 || Win||align=left| Zheng Kai|| Hero Legends|| China || Decision (unanimous) || 3 || 3:00
|-  style="background:#cfc;"
| 2017-04-28 || Win||align=left| Jacob Hebeisen||Lion Fight 36|| United States || KO (Left High Kick) || 2 || 
|-  style="background:#c5d2ea;"
| 2016-10-02 || Draw||align=left| Liu Wei|| Hero Legends|| China || Decision Draw || 3 || 3:00
|-  style="background:#cfc;"
| 2016-09-11 || Win||align=left| Liu Lianfeng|| Hero Legends|| China || Decision (unanimous) || 3 || 3:00
|-  style="background:#cfc;"
| 2016-07-09 || Win||align=left| Cui Jianhui|| Hero Legends|| China || Decision (unanimous) || 3 || 3:00
|-  style="background:#cfc;"
| 2016-01-16 || Win||align=left| Tang Yao|| Hero Legends|| China || Decision (unanimous) || 3 || 3:00
|-  style="background:#cfc;"
| 2015-12-13 || Win||align=left| Garraffo || WBK 9 || China || Decision (unanimous) || 3 || 3:00
|-  style="background:#fbb;"
| 2015-11-13 || Loss ||align=left| Deng Zeqi || Wu Lin Feng & WCK Muaythai: China vs USA || Las Vegas, USA || Decision || 3 || 3:00
|-  style="background:#cfc;"
| 2015-04-26 || Win||align=left| Wei Ninghui || Kunlun Fight 23 || Changsha, China || Decision (unanimous) || 3 || 3:00
|-  style="background:#cfc;"
| 2015-01-03 || Win||align=left| Wang Wanben || Kunlun Fight 15 & 16 || Nanjing, China || Decision (unanimous) || 3 || 3:00
|-  style="background:#fbb;"
| 2014-11-16 || Loss ||align=left| Li Ning || Kunlun Fight 13 || Hohhot, China || Decision (unanimous) || 3 || 3:00
|-  style="background:#cfc;"
| 2014-02-16 || Win ||align=left| Wei Rui || Kunlun Fight 2 || Zhengzhou, China || Decision (unanimous) || 3 || 3:00
|-  style="background:#cfc;"
| 2014-01-25 || Win ||align=left| Deng Zeqi || Kunlun Fight 1 || Pattaya, Thailand || Decision (unanimous) || 3 || 3:00
|-
! style=background:white colspan=9 |
|-  style="background:#cfc;"
| 2013-11-02 || Win ||align=left| Deng Zeqi || WCK Muay Thai vs. Wulinfeng 2013 || Las Vegas, Nevada || Decision (unanimous) || 5 || 3:00
|-
! style=background:white colspan=9 |
|-  style="background:#fbb;"
| 2012-11-14 || Loss ||align=left| Deng Zeqi || WCK Muay Thai "Wulinfeng Spectacular" || Las Vegas, Nevada || Decision (Split) || 5|| 3:00
|-
|-  style="background:#fbb;"
| 2012-09-08 || Loss ||align=left| Gabriel Varga || K-1 World Grand Prix 2012 in Los Angeles || Los Angeles, California || Decision (unanimous) || 3|| 3:00
|-
! style=background:white colspan=9 |
|-  style="background:#fbb;"
| 2010-02-16 || Loss||align=left| F-16 Rachanon || Por.Pramook Fight, Lumpinee Stadium || Bangkok, Thailand || Decision || 5 || 3:00
|-  style="background:#fbb;"
| 2009-12-19 || Loss||align=left| Singdam Kiatmoo9 || Muaythai Lumpinee Krikkrai Fights || Bangkok, Thailand || Decision || 5 || 3:00
|-  style="background:#fbb;"
| 2009-11-14 || Loss ||align=left| Orono Wor Petchpun || Muaythai Lumpinee Krikkrai Fights || Bangkok, Thailand || Decision || 5 || 3:00
|-  style="background:#fbb;"
| 2009-10-10 || Loss ||align=left| Tuantong Phumpanmoung || Muaythai Lumpinee Krikkrai Fights || Bangkok, Thailand || TKO || 5 || 
|-  style="background:#cfc;"
| 2009-08-15 || Win ||align=left| Pansak Look Bor Kor || Muaythai Lumpinee Krikkrai Fights || Bangkok, Thailand || Decision || 5 || 3:00
|-  style="background:#fbb;"
| 2009-07-25 || Loss ||align=left| Panpet Chor.Na Pattalung || Muaythai Lumpinee Krikkrai Fight || Bangkok, Thailand || Decision || 5 || 3:00
|-  style="background:#cfc;"
| 2009-06-19 || Win ||align=left| Pettaksin Sor.Thumpet || Petchpiya Fights, Lumpinee Stadium || Bangkok, Thailand || Decision || 5 || 3:00
|-  style="background:#fbb;"
| 2009-03-20 || Loss ||align=left| Nong-O Sit Or || Suek Petchyindee, Lumpinee Stadium || Bangkok, Thailand || Decision || 5 || 3:00
|-  style="background:#cfc;"
| 2009-02-17 || Win ||align=left| Yodbuengarm Loogbanyai || Paianun Fight, Lumpinee Stadium || Bangkok, Thailand || Decision || 5 || 3:00
|-  style="background:#cfc;"
| 2009-01-17 || Win ||align=left| Pueangnoi Petsupapan || Muaythai Lumpinee Krikkrai Fights || Bangkok, Thailand || Decision || 5 || 3:00
|-  style="background:#fbb;"
| 2008-12-27 || Loss ||align=left| Yodbuangarm Loogbaanyai || Muaythai Lumpinee Krikkrai Fights || Bangkok, Thailand || Decision || 5 || 3:00
|-  style="background:#fbb;"
| 2008-11-01 || Loss ||align=left| Kaew Fairtex || Muaythai on Channel 5 || Thailand || Decision || 5 || 3:00
|-  style="background:#fbb;"
| 2008-09-26 || Loss ||align=left| Kaew Fairtex || Wanboonya Fights, Lumpinee Stadium || Bangkok, Thailand || Decision || 5 || 3:00
|-  style="background:#cfc;"
| 2008-06-02 || Win ||align=left| Thongsuk Sor Damrongrit || Daorungchujarern Fights, Rajadamnern Stadium || Bangkok, Thailand || Decision || 5 || 3:00
|-  style="background:#cfc;"
| 2008-05-01 || Win ||align=left| Thongsuk Sor Damrongrit || Daorungchujarern Fights, Rajadamnern Stadium || Bangkok, Thailand || Decision || 5 || 3:00
|-  style="background:#fbb;"
| 2008-03-31 || Loss ||align=left| Iquezang Kor.Rungthanakeat || Daorungchujarern Fights, Rajadamnern Stadium || Bangkok, Thailand || Decision || 5 || 3:00
|-  style="background:#cfc;"
| 2007-12-20 || Win ||align=left| Anuwat Kaewsamrit || Daorungchujarern Fights, Rajadamnern Stadium || Bangkok, Thailand || Decision || 5 || 3:00
|-  style="background:#fbb;"
| 2007-11-27 || Loss||align=left| Sarawut Lookbarnyai || Kai Yang Har Dao Tournament || Thailand || Decision || 5 || 3:00
|-  style="background:#fbb;"
| 2007-06-21 || Loss ||align=left| Jomthong Chuwattana || Rajadamnern Stadium || Bangkok, Thailand || Decision || 5 || 3:00
|-  style="background:#cfc;"
| 2007-05-03 || Win ||align=left| Jaroenchai Kesagym || Daowrungchujarern Fights, Rajadamnern Stadium || Bangkok, Thailand || Decision || 5 || 3:00
|-  style="background:#cfc;"
| 2007-02-14 || Win ||align=left| Nongbee Kiatyongyut || S.Sommay Fights, Rajadamnern Stadium || Bangkok, Thailand || Decision || 5 || 3:00
|-  style="background:#fbb;"
| 2006-12-21 || Loss ||align=left| Orono Tawan || Daowrungchujarern + Jarumueng Fights, Rajadamnern Stadium || Bangkok, Thailand || Decision || 5 || 3:00
|-  style="background:#cfc;"
| 2006-11-16 || Win ||align=left| Pheteak Kiatyongyut || Daowrungchujarern + Jarumueng Fights, Rajadamnern Stadium || Bangkok, Thailand || TKO || 4 || 
|-  style="background:#fbb;"
| 2006-10-05 || Loss ||align=left| Jomthong Chuwattana || Daorungchujaroen Fights, Rajadamnern Stadium || Bangkok, Thailand || Decision || 5 || 3:00
|-  style="background:#cfc;"
| 2006-08-23 || Win ||align=left|  Jaroenchai Kesagym || Jarumueang Fights, Rajadamnern Stadium || Bangkok, Thailand || Decision || 5 || 3:00
|-  style="background:#cfc;"
| 2006-07-06 || Win ||align=left| Phetto Sitjaopor || Daorungchujaroen Fights, Rajadamnern Stadium || Bangkok, Thailand || Decision || 5 || 3:00
|-  style="background:#c5d2ea"
| 2006-05-18 || Draw ||align=left| Jomthong Chuwattana || Daorungchujarean Fights, Rajadamnern Stadium || Bangkok, Thailand || Decision Draw || 5 || 3:00
|-  style="background:#cfc;"
| 2006-04-05 || Win ||align=left| Duwao Kongudom || Jarumuang Fights, Rajadamnern Stadium || Bangkok, Thailand || Decision || 5 || 3:00
|-  style="background:#cfc;"
| 2006-02-15 || Win ||align=left| Sayannoi Kiatprapat || Jarumuang Fights, Rajadamnern Stadium || Bangkok, Thailand || Decision || 5 || 3:00
|-  style="background:#fbb;"
| 2005-12-19 || Loss ||align=left| Jomthong Chuwattana || Daorungchujarean Fights, Rajadamnern Stadium || Bangkok, Thailand || Decision || 5 || 3:00
|-  style="background:#fbb;"
| 2005-11-17 || Loss ||align=left| Singtongnoi Por.Telakun || Daorungchujarean Fights, Rajadamnern Stadium || Bangkok, Thailand || Decision || 5 || 3:00
|-  style="background:#cfc;"
| 2005-10-24 || Win ||align=left| Seanchuanglak Jirakriangkri || Daorungchujarean Fights, Rajadamnern Stadium || Bangkok, Thailand || Decision || 5 || 3:00
|-  style="background:#cfc;"
| 2005-09-19 || Win ||align=left| Jo Zujiya || Daorungchujarean Fights, Rajadamnern Stadium || Bangkok, Thailand || TKO || 2 || 
|-  style="background:#cfc;"
| 2005-08-04 || Win ||align=left| Teelak N.Sipuang || Daorungchujarean Fights, Rajadamnern Stadium || Bangkok, Thailand || TKO || 4 || 
|-  style="background:#cfc;"
| 2005-06-03 || Win ||align=left| Deatsak S.Thumphet || Seangmaurakot Fights, Rajadamnern Stadium || Bangkok, Thailand || Decision || 5 || 3:00
|-  style="background:#fbb;"
| 2005-05-12 || Loss ||align=left| Deatsak S.Thumphet || Daorungchujarean Fights, Rajadamnern Stadium || Bangkok, Thailand || Decision || 5 || 3:00
|-  style="background:#cfc;"
| 2005-03-24 || Win ||align=left| Dendanai Kiatsakkongka || Daorungchujarean Fights, Rajadamnern Stadium || Bangkok, Thailand || Decision || 5 || 3:00
|-  style="background:#fbb;"
| 2005-01-26 || Loss ||align=left| Anuwat Kaewsamrit || Daorungchujarean Fights, Rajadamnern Stadium || Bangkok, Thailand || TKO || 4 || 
|-  style="background:#cfc;"
| 2004-12-23 ||Win ||align=left| Watcharachai Kaewsamrit ||Rajadamnern Stadium || Bangkok, Thailand || Decision || 5 || 3:00
|-  style="background:#fbb;"
| 2004-11-04 || Loss ||align=left| Nopparat Keatkhamtorn || Daorungchujarean Fights, Rajadamnern Stadium || Bangkok, Thailand || Decision || 5 || 3:00
|-  style="background:#cfc;"
| 2004-09-01 || Win ||align=left| Extra S.Reakchai || Jarumueang Fights, Rajadamnern Stadium || Bangkok, Thailand || Decision || 5 || 3:00
|-  style="background:#fbb;"
| 2004-07-29 || Loss ||align=left| Seanchernglak Jirakrengkri || Jarumueang Fights, Rajadamnern Stadium || Bangkok, Thailand || Decision || 5 || 3:00
|-  style="background:#cfc;"
| 2004-06-17 ||Win ||align=left| Thailand Pinsinchai || Daorungchujarean Fights, Rajadamnern Stadium || Bangkok, Thailand || Decision || 5 || 3:00 
|-
! style=background:white colspan=9 |
|-  style="background:#fbb;"
| 2004-04-01 || Loss ||align=left|Watcharachai Kaewsamrit || Daorungchujarean Fights, Rajadamnern Stadium || Bangkok, Thailand || TKO || 3 || 
|-  style="background:#fbb;"
| 2003-12-18 || Loss ||align=left| Kongpipop Petchyindee || Rajadamnern Stadium || Bangkok, Thailand || Decision || 5 || 3:00
|-  style="background:#cfc;"
| 2003-11-24 ||Win ||align=left| Watcharachai Kaewsamrit||Rajadamnern Stadium || Bangkok, Thailand || Decision || 5 || 3:00
|-  style="background:#cfc;"
| 2003-10-09 ||Win ||align=left| Seanchai Jirakreangkri||Rajadamnern Stadium || Bangkok, Thailand || Decision || 5 || 3:00
|-  style="background:#fbb;"
| 2003-08-14 || Loss ||align=left| Saenchernnglek Jirakriengkrai ||  Lumpinee Stadium || Bangkok, Thailand || KO || 3 ||
|-  style="background:#cfc;"
| 2003-07-17 ||Win ||align=left| Fahsuchon Sit-O ||Lumpinee Stadium || Bangkok, Thailand || Decision || 5 || 3:00
|-  style="background:#cfc;"
| 2003- ||Win ||align=left| Watcharachai Kaewsamrit||Rajadamnern Stadium || Bangkok, Thailand || Decision || 5 || 3:00
|-  style="background:#cfc;"
| 2003- ||Win ||align=left| Chaomailek Sor.Thantawan ||Rajadamnern Stadium || Bangkok, Thailand || Decision || 5 || 3:00
|-  style="background:#cfc;"
| 2003-03-31 ||Win ||align=left| Thailand Pinsinchai || Daorungchujarean Fights, Rajadamnern Stadium || Bangkok, Thailand || Decision || 5 || 3:00 
|-  style="background:#cfc;"
| 2003-02- ||Win ||align=left| Chutin Por.Tawachai || Rajadamnern Stadium || Bangkok, Thailand || Decision || 5 || 3:00 
|-  style="background:#cfc;"
| 2003-01- ||Win ||align=left| Saenchernglek Jirakriengkrai || || Chiang Mai, Thailand || Decision || 5 || 3:00 
|-  style="background:#;"
| 2002-03-11 ||  ||align=left| Singdam Kiatmuu9 || Rajadamnern Stadium || Bangkok, Thailand || ||  ||
|-  bgcolor="#fbb"
| 2000-07-05 || Loss ||align=left| Norasing Kiatprasarnchai ||  || Bangkok, Thailand || KO || 3 ||
|-  bgcolor="#fbb"
| 2000-07-04 || Loss||align=left| Laemsing Por.Nitiwat ||Rajadamnern Stadium  || Bangkok, Thailand || Decision || 5 ||3:00
|-  bgcolor="#cfc"
| 1999-10-25 || Win ||align=left| Laemsing Por.Nitiwat ||Rajadamnern Stadium  || Bangkok, Thailand || Decision || 5 ||3:00
|-  bgcolor=""
| 1998-12-23 || ||align=left| Watcharachai Kaewsamrit ||  || Bangkok, Thailand ||  ||  ||
|-  bgcolor="#cfc"
| 1998-12-07 || Win ||align=left| Lanna Por.Phisut||  || Bangkok, Thailand || Decision || 5 ||3:00
|-  bgcolor="#fbb"
| 1998-10-29 || Loss||align=left| Jaomailek Sor Thanawan||  || Bangkok, Thailand || Decision || 5 ||3:00
|-  style="background:#cfc;"
| 1997- ||Win ||align=left| Decha M-16 || || Bangkok, Thailand || Decision || 5 || 3:00 
|-
| colspan=9 | Legend:    

|-  style="background:#fbb;"
| 2013-10-23 || Loss ||align=left| Igor Liubchenko || 2013 World Combat Games, Final || Bangkok, Thailand || Decision ||  || 
|-
! style=background:white colspan=9 |

|-  style="background:#cfc;"
| 2013-10-21 || Win ||align=left| Sofiane Bougossa  || 2013 World Combat Games|| Bangkok, Thailand || Decision ||  ||

|-
| colspan=9 | Legend:

See also
List of male kickboxers

References

1981 births
Living people
Featherweight kickboxers
Lerdsila Chumpairtour
Lerdsila Chumpairtour
Lerdsila Chumpairtour
Lerdsila Chumpairtour